is a Japanese freestyle swimmer. He won the bronze medal by swimming for the Japanese team in the 4 × 100 m medley event at the 2013 World Aquatics Championships in Barcelona alongside his team mates Ryosuke Irie, Kosuke Kitajima and Takuro Fujii.

References

Living people
Japanese male freestyle swimmers
People from Isehara, Kanagawa
Sportspeople from Kanagawa Prefecture
1991 births
World Aquatics Championships medalists in swimming
Swimmers at the 2016 Summer Olympics
Olympic swimmers of Japan
Medalists at the FINA World Swimming Championships (25 m)
Asian Games gold medalists for Japan
Asian Games silver medalists for Japan
Medalists at the 2014 Asian Games
Medalists at the 2018 Asian Games
Asian Games medalists in swimming
Universiade medalists in swimming
Swimmers at the 2014 Asian Games
Swimmers at the 2018 Asian Games
Universiade gold medalists for Japan
Medalists at the 2011 Summer Universiade
Swimmers at the 2020 Summer Olympics
21st-century Japanese people